Manila Jeepney Football Club is a professional Filipino football club, based in the city of Manila, Philippines. The team competed in the United Football League, the highest level of club football in the Philippines.

The team entered the United Football League as a guest team in the 2013 United Football League Cup, before being admitted as an official club of the UFL Division 2 in 2014. In their first season in the second division of the United Football League, the team won promotion to the first division. However, after participating at the 2015 season it withdrew from the league. It is acknowledged as the official football club of the city of Manila.

Etymology
The name of the football club is derived from the jeepney, a popular mode of transport in the Philippines.

History
Manila Jeepney FC was established in June 2013 with the vision of being the official city team of the City of Manila. The Club was founded by young business executives and passionate football fans led by Javier Mantecon, Alfonso Javier and Antonio Longa.

A first squad was formed under the auspices of former Kaya FC coach, Kale Alvarez. The club made its debut at the United Football League in 2013 participating at the 2013 UFL Cup where it reached the knockout stages. Manila Jeepney later entered the league proper in 2014, and entered Division 2 of the league. It finished second in the UFL-2 2014 season and earned a promotion to UFL Division 1.

Sponsorships

In late September 2013, the Club secured support from the ICTSI Foundation Inc., and CORD Chemicals Inc. as the primary partners.

In October 2013, the City of Manila officially acknowledged the Club as the official city team of Manila with complete backing from the Mayor, the Honorable Joseph Ejercito (Erap) Estrada and Vice Mayor, Francisco (Isko) Moreno.

Football development program
Manila Jeepney was established to support the development of football in the city of Manila. The club partnered with Leveriza F.C., which is a grassroots team composing of youths from the slums in Manila.

Simultaneously with its participation in league competitions, the club undertook its one-of-a-kind football advocacy program aimed at enhancing lives of Manila's street children population through football with Project LIPAD. The project aspires to have an intake of approximately 100 children in the initial stages with plans to expand further to cover more.

Current squad

Foreigners
In the United Football League, there can be more than five non-Filipino nationals in a team as long as they are registered. Foreign players who have acquired permanent residency can be registered as locals.

 In Hyun-don
 Yoo Tae-kyung
 Rodrigue Nembot
 Alvaro Alonso Vazquez
 N'galy Epesso
 Davide Cortina
 N'gnan Koffi Kouassi

Kit manufacturers and shirt sponsors

Coaches
Coaches by Years (2013–2015)

Honors

Domestic competitions
 United Football League Division 2
 Runners-up : 2014

Records

Key
 Tms. = Number of teams
 Pos. = Position in league
 TBD  = To be determined
 DNQ  = Did not qualify

References

External links
 Official Facebook Page

Football clubs in the Philippines
Association football clubs established in 2013
2013 establishments in the Philippines
Sports teams in Metro Manila